Field & Stream is an American monthly sports magazine.

Field & Stream may also refer to:
Field & Stream (retailer), an American retailer of hunting, fishing, camping and related outdoor recreation merchandise

Video games
Field & Stream: Trophy Bass 3D, see Dynamix
Field & Stream: Trophy Bass 4 on List of Sierra Entertainment video games
Field & Stream: Trophy Buck 'n Bass 2 on List of Sierra Entertainment video games
Field & Stream: Trophy Hunting 4 on List of Sierra Entertainment video games
Field & Stream: Total Outdoorsman Challenge, an Xbox 360 game

See also
Fields and Streams, album by Kill Rock Stars
Field of Streams, a patch of sky where several stellar streams are visible and crisscross